Hagens is a Dutch family name. The name is a derivation from Petershagen, and originates in the 15th century in the eastern Netherlands. Notable people with the surname include:

Bradin Hagens (born 1989), American baseball player
Erik Hagens (born 1940), Danish painter 
Gunther von Hagens (born 1945), German scientist
Hendrik Hagens (1900–1981), Dutch fencer

See also
Hagen (surname)
Hagen's ( product brand )

Dutch-language surnames